Marta Cartabia (born 14 May 1963) is an Italian jurist and academic who served as Minister of Justice in the government of Prime Minister Mario Draghi.

Cartabia previously was Judge of the Constitutional Court of Italy between 2011 and 2020, Vice President from 12 November 2014 to 11 December 2019 and President from 11 December 2019 to 13 September 2020. She is a professor of constitutional law. She was the first woman to hold the office of President of the Constitutional Court.

Early life and education
Cartabia was born in San Giorgio su Legnano, near Milan, in 1963. In 1987, she graduated with honours at the University of Milan, with the thesis "Does a European Constitution exist?" with professor Valerio Onida as her supervisor. She obtained a Ph.D. in law from the European University Institute in Florence in 1993.

Career
Cartabia worked at the Constitutional Court of Italy as a clerk between 1993 and 1996. In 2005, she was employed by the University of Milano-Bicocca as professor of the Jean Monnet Course of European Constitutional Law. Between 2006 and 2010 she worked as an independent expert for the European Union Agency for Fundamental Rights (FRA) in Vienna. For the academic year 2009–2010 Cartabia was a Straus Fellow at "The Straus Institute for the Advanced Study of Law & Justice" in New York City.

Constitutional Judge
Cartabia was appointed as Judge on the Constitutional Court by the President of Italy, Giorgio Napolitano, on 2 September 2011, and sworn into office on 13 September 2011. At the time of her appointment she was one of the youngest appointees ever, and only the third woman in history. Cartabia succeeded Maria Rita Saulle, who had died in office. She was appointed Vice President of the Court on 12 November 2014. On 11 December 2019 Cartabia succeeded Giorgio Lattanzi as President of the Constitutional Court, becoming the first woman to hold the position. Cartabia received all 14 votes. Cartabia's term in office ended on 13 September 2020. She was succeeded as president by Mario Rosario Morelli and as Judge by Emanuela Navarretta.

In December 2017, Cartabia was appointed as a substitute member for Italy to the European Commission for Democracy through Law of the Council of Europe, also known as Venice Commission.

Minister of Justice 
On 13 February 2021, she became Minister of Justice in the Draghi cabinet, a national unity government, succeeding Alfonso Bonafede. Cartabia is the third woman after Paola Severino and Annamaria Cancelleri to hold this position. On 28 April she obtained the extradition to Italy of seven former left-wing terrorists of the period of the lead years, who had found protection in France due to the Mitterrand doctrine.

On 8 July 2021, the Council of Ministers launched the reform of the criminal justice system, spearheaded by Cartabia herself, in collaboration with commission of experts chaired by the former president of the constitutional court Giorgio Lattanzi. In November 2021, the reform of the Italian civil procedure was also approved by the parliament. These reforms were important in order to obtain European post-COVID-19 recovery funds. As Minister of Justice, she has shown herself in favor of the implementation of substitutive sentences for prison such as semi-release, home detention, community service and fines for those who are given sentence up to four years.

Recognition 
Cartabia was made Knight Grand Cross in the Order of Merit of the Italian Republic on 24 October 2011.

Writings 
 
 
 
 
 *

References

|-

1963 births
Living people
Draghi Cabinet
European University Institute alumni
Female justice ministers
Italian Ministers of Justice
Judges of the Constitutional Court of Italy
Knights Grand Cross of the Order of Merit of the Italian Republic
People from San Giorgio su Legnano
Presidents of the Constitutional Court of Italy
Academic staff of the University of Milano-Bicocca
Vice Presidents of the Constitutional Court of Italy
Candidates for President of Italy
University of Milan alumni